Hsieh Cheng-peng and Yi Chu-huan were the defending champions, but chose to defend their title with different partners. Hsieh partnered Zhang Ze but lost in the first round to Wu Yibing and Wu Di. Yi partnered Toshihide Matsui and successfully defended his title.

Matsui and Yi won the title after defeating Bradley Klahn and Peter Polansky 6–7(1–7), 6–4, [10–5] in the final.

Seeds

Draw

References

 Main Draw

Shanghai Challenger - Doubles
2017 Doubles